The Nielson was an automobile built in Detroit, Michigan by the Nielson Motor Car Company in 1907.

History 
The Nielson was built as a two-seater runabout equipped with a single-cylinder 12 hp air-cooled engine.  The engine was located behind the seat, and was equipped with a friction transmission and double-chain drive.  The vehicle was priced at $800, .  E. A .Nielson drove his runabout to New York City and displayed it at the Selzer Garage.

Automotive historians have speculated that E .A. Nielson may have been Emil A. Nelson who had previously worked for Packard and who would do design work for Hupmobile beginning in 1908.

References

Defunct motor vehicle manufacturers of the United States
Motor vehicle manufacturers based in Michigan
Defunct manufacturing companies based in Michigan
Brass Era vehicles
1900s cars
Vehicle manufacturing companies established in 1906
Vehicle manufacturing companies disestablished in 1907
Cars introduced in 1906